Faber Double-Crib Barn is a historic barn located near Kenna, Jackson County, West Virginia. A 22 feet wide breezeway, originally with a thrashing floor, separates the two pens.

It was listed on the National Register of Historic Places in 2005.

References

Barns on the National Register of Historic Places in West Virginia
Infrastructure completed in 1860
Buildings and structures in Jackson County, West Virginia
National Register of Historic Places in Jackson County, West Virginia
Barns in West Virginia